was a village located in Sorachi District, Sorachi Subprefecture, Hokkaido, Japan.

As of 2004, the village had an estimated population of 3,671 and a density of 38.05 persons per km2. The total area was 96.49 km2.

On March 27, 2006, Kita, along with the town of Kurisawa (also from Sorachi District) was merged into the expanded city of Iwamizawa.

External links
 Iwamizawa official website 

Dissolved municipalities of Hokkaido